Council Estate of Mind is the debut studio album by English rapper Skinnyman, released on 9 August 2004 by Low Life Records. It was produced by DJ Flip, Stoned Soldiers, Adam M, and others. The album makes use of samples from Made in Britain, a British film from the early 1980s. The album spent two weeks on the UK Albums Chart, peaking at number 65.

Release and legacy
Skinnyman self-recorded the album, taking it to Low Life Records for a formal release. Label owner Joseph Christie, also known as Braintax, shut down the label a few years after the release of Council Estate of Mind, disappearing without compensating Skinnyman with album royalties.

Council Estate of Mind is regarded as a British hip hop classic, noted as a "illustrative depiction of life in Britain for young, working-class people."

Track listing

Charts

References

2004 debut albums
Low Life Records albums
Skinnyman albums